The Tasmanian froglet (Crinia tasmaniensis) is a species of ground-dwelling frog that occurs only in Tasmania, Australia.

Description

This is a fairly small species of frog, up to about 30 mm. It is variable, but is generally brown (dark to reddish) or grey and can have spots or blotches of another colour, at times this species can be completely dark brown or black, with no variation in colour throughout the dorsal surface. The dorsal surface can be bumpy or smooth. There is often a reddish stripe present from the nostril down the side. The ventral surface is mostly white, however it has some red and dark blotches as well as red in the thighs.

Ecology and behaviour

This species of frog is only found in Tasmania. It inhabits shallow streams, temporary ponds and puddles, dams, swamps and soaks, mostly at higher altitudes throughout most of the state. It is frequently encountered in the west of the state. It can be found in rainforest, cleared, woodland and alpine habitats.

Males make a lamb-like call, from land beside water or while floating in water, mainly in spring and summer.

Up to 100 eggs are laid in still water all year round. Tadpoles are brown-grey and reach  in length.

This is one of only three species of frogs endemic to Tasmania.

Sources
Frogs Australia Network-frog call available here.
Anstis, M. 2002. Tadpoles of South-eastern Australia. Reed New Holland: Sydney.
Robinson, M. 2002. A Field Guide to Frogs of Australia. Australian Museum/Reed New Holland: Sydney.

References

Crinia
Amphibians of Tasmania
Amphibians described in 1864
Taxa named by Albert Günther
Frogs of Australia